Montenegro competed at the 2012 Winter Youth Olympics in Innsbruck, Austria. The Montenegro team was made up of one athlete, an alpine skier.

Alpine skiing

Montenegro qualified one girl in alpine skiing.

Girl

See also
Montenegro at the 2012 Summer Olympics

References

Nations at the 2012 Winter Youth Olympics
2012 in Montenegrin sport
Montenegro at the Youth Olympics